Kohe Mondi (also knowns as Koh-e-Mondi or Koh-i-Mondi) is a mountain peak located at  above sea level in the Hindu Kush mountain range in Afghanistan.

Location 
Kohe Mondi is located in the Kuran wa Munjan District of the Badakhshan Province. The mountain is located in the central section of the Hindu Kush mountain range. Its flanks are drained by the Mundschan, the right source river of the Kokcha River, running to the west.

First ascent 
Kohe Mondi was first climbed on July 26, 1962, by a group of mountaineers from Bamberg (Otto Reus, Hanno Vogel and Sepp Ziegler).

References 

Mountains of Afghanistan
Mountains of the Hindu Kush